Yara Antoine Bou Rada (born 7 August 2000) is a Lebanese footballer who plays as a forward for Lebanese club EFP.

Club career 
Born in Zgharta, Lebanon, Bou Rada began her career at hometown club Salam Zgharta's boys youth sector aged seven. She remained at the club when they formed a girls sector, and made her U17 debut in 2015. After playing for the U19s, she made her Lebanese Women's Football League debut in 2016.

After two seasons at Salam Zgharta, Bou Rada joined reigning league champions Stars Association for Sports (SAS) in 2018. She spent two seasons at the club, scoring 18 league goals and winning two league titles.

On 20 October 2020, Bou Rada moved to Safa on a three-year contract. She helped Safa win the 2022 edition of the WAFF Women's Clubs Championship, becoming the first Lebanese team to do so; Bou Rada finished as joint-top goalscorer with two goals.

International career 
Bou Rada first represented Lebanon internationally at under-18 level at the 2018 WAFF U-18 Women's Championship in Lebanon, where they finished runners-up. She made her senior debut at the 2020 Olympic Qualifying Tournament in 2018, and was called up to the 2019 WAFF Women's Championship, finishing third.

Personal life 
In 2020, Bou Rada was majoring in economics.

Honours 
SAS
 Lebanese Women's Football League: 2018–19, 2019–20
 Lebanese Women's FA Cup: 2018–19
 Lebanese Women's Super Cup: 2018
 WAFF Women's Clubs Championship runner-up: 2019

Safa
 WAFF Women's Clubs Championship: 2022
 Lebanese Women's Football League: 2020–21

Lebanon U18
 WAFF U-18 Women's Championship runner-up: 2018

Lebanon
 WAFF Women's Championship third place: 2019

Individual
 WAFF Women's Clubs Championship top goalscorer: 2022

See also
 List of Lebanon women's international footballers

Notes

References

External links

 
 
 

2000 births
Living people
People from Zgharta
Lebanese women's footballers
Women's association football forwards
Salam Zgharta FC (women) players
Stars Association for Sports players
Safa WFC players
Eleven Football Pro players
Lebanese Women's Football League players
Lebanon women's youth international footballers
Lebanon women's international footballers